Kickxia spuria is a species of flowering plant in the family Plantaginaceae known by several common names, including roundleaf cancerwort and round-leaved fluellen. It is native to Europe and Asia, but it is present on other continents as an introduced species, and sometimes a noxious weed. This is a low hairy herb with a creeping stem with many branches. It produces rounded, fuzzy leaves at wide intervals along the stem, and solitary snapdragon-like flowers. Each flower is up to 1.5 centimeters long with a narrow, pointed spur extending from the back. The lobes of the mouth are yellow, white, and deep purple, and the whole flower is fuzzy to hairy. The fruit is a spherical capsule about 4 millimeters long. This species is similar to its relative, Kickxia elatine, but for the shape of its leaves, and the hairy flower stalk, which is bare with Kickxia elatine.

References

External links
Jepson Manual Treatment
Photo gallery
Kickxia spuria  occurrence data from GBIF

spuria
Flora of Europe
Flora of temperate Asia